Angelique Kerber was the defending champion and successfully defended her title, defeating Laura Siegemund in the final, 6–4, 6–0.

Seeds
The top four seeds received a bye into the second round.

Draw

Finals

Top half

Bottom half

Qualifying

Seeds

Qualifiers

Lucky loser
  Camila Giorgi

Draw

First qualifier

Second qualifier

Third qualifier

Fourth qualifier

References 
 Main Draw
 Qualifying Draw

2016 WTA Tour
2016 Singles